Ankit Kumar (born 1 November 1997) is an Indian cricketer. He made his first-class debut for Haryana in the 2018–19 Ranji Trophy on 14 December 2018. He made his Twenty20 debut for Haryana in the 2018–19 Syed Mushtaq Ali Trophy on 2 March 2019. He made his List A debut on 4 October 2019, for Haryana in the 2019–20 Vijay Hazare Trophy.

References

External links
 

1997 births
Living people
Indian cricketers
Haryana cricketers
Place of birth missing (living people)
21st-century Indian people